Yashio Dam is an asphalt dam located in Tochigi prefecture in Japan. The dam is used for power production. The catchment area of the dam is 2 km2. The dam impounds about 47  ha of land when full and can store 11900 thousand cubic meters of water. The construction of the dam was started on 1986 and completed in 1992.

References

Dams in Tochigi Prefecture
1992 establishments in Japan